Several ships and shore establishments of the Royal Navy have borne the name HMS Medina, after the River Medina on the Isle of Wight:

  was a yacht that served the Governor of the Isle of Wight; she was broken up at Portsmouth in 1832.
  was a 2-gun  paddle packet boat completed in 1840. She was converted into a survey ship in 1856 and broken up in March 1864.
  was a  gunboat launched 1876, sold in 1904.
 , an Admiralty M-class destroyer that served during the First World War. The ship was originally named Redmill but renamed before being launched in 1916 and was sold for breaking up in 1921.
 , landing craft and Fleet Air Arm shore establishment, Puckpool, Ryde, Isle of Wight.

Citations and references
Citations

References
 
 

Royal Navy ship names